The season 2008–09 of the Ranji Trophy began on 4 November, and finished on 16 January with the final. 15 teams were divided in two groups. The 3 top teams of each group qualified to the playoffs, plus the two top teams of the plate league (Himachal Pradesh and Bengal). Mumbai won the final by defeating Uttar Pradesh.

First round

Group A

Group B

Playoffs
Four top teams of the plate group league qualified for the playoffs.

* FIL – First Innings Lead

Plate playoffs

Quarterfinals

Semi-finals
Mumbai were the first team to qualify for the final after on the basis of a lead over Saurashtra's first-innings total. The latter were dismissed for 379 in their first innings by Mumbai who made 637. Wasim Jaffer top-scored with 301 for them, while Sachin Tendulkar made 122.

Uttar Pradesh advanced to the final, also by virtue of a first-innings lead, over Tamil Nadu. In reply to the latter's first innings total of 445, Uttar Pradesh's Shivakant Shukla, who made an unbeaten 178 in 569 balls and 821 minutes, helped his team go past the score securing a qualification for the final. Parvinder Singh, who scored his maiden first-class century, and Shukla batted for a total of five-and-half-hours, and added 272 runs for the fourth wicket.

Final

Records

 In the 2nd Semifinal, Shivakant Shukla was at the bat by 821 minutes, the fourth longest innings in first class and the second in Indian cricket, in this time he scored 178 runs at 569 balls faced for guide to Uttar Pradesh to the final.

Statistics

Runs

Wickets

References

External links 
 2008–09 Ranji Trophy at ESPNcricinfo
 

Ranji Trophy seasons
Domestic cricket competitions in 2008–09
2008 in Indian cricket
2009 in Indian cricket